The 1964–65 season was the 63rd in the history of the Western Football League.

The champions for the first time in their history were Welton Rovers.

Final table
The league remained at 22 clubs with no clubs leaving or joining the league.

References

1964-65
5